A single scull (or a scull) is a rowing boat designed for a single person who propels the boat with two oars, one in each hand.

Racing boats (often called "shells") are long, narrow, and broadly semi-circular in cross-section in order to minimize drag. They have riggers, which apply the forces symmetrically to each side of the boat and (usually) a fin towards the rear which helps prevent roll and yaw. Originally made from wood, shells are now almost always made from a composite material (usually carbon-fibre reinforced plastic) for strength and weight advantages.

Recreational single sculls tend to be shorter and a little wider than racing boats and can have a slightly flattened hull shape to provide more stability. Recreational single sculls can be made of a variety of materials including carbon fiber, fiberglass, wood or rotomoulded polyethylene.

The single scull is the 2nd slowest category of racing boat (faster than the coxed pair), and competitors are recognised by other rowers as among the toughest, both physically and mentally: single sculling is sometimes known as 'king's class'.

The single scull is one of the classes recognized by the International Rowing Federation and the Olympics, who set the minimum weight of the hull at 14 kg (30.8 lbs): the average length is around 8.2 m (27 ft).

 
Single sculls are also used for the training of team rowers, serving primarily to enhance the rowers' individual technique and watermanship.  The main reason for this is that in the single scull the sculler is responsible for all movement in the boat and therefore receives direct feedback on the effect of their movements on balance and speed.

Single sculling time trials and races are sometimes used to measure individuals' rowing ability for selection into larger boats, since each rower's ability can be measured directly and there is no contribution from other crew members.  However sculling ability and sweep-oar rowing ability are not the same. Powerful and accomplished sweep-oar rowers may be unable to demonstrate their ability in a single scull, where balance and technique are more critical.

A single Thames skiff has a similar layout to a single scull but is clinker-built with fixed seats and tholes instead of outriggers and can be skiffed for leisure outings or in competitive races.

Major competitions

Wingfield Sculls (1830-)
World Sculling Championship (1831-1957)
Diamond Challenge Sculls at Henley Royal Regatta (1844-)
Rowing at the Summer Olympics (1900-)
World Rowing Championships (1962-)

See also

Double scull
Quad scull

References

Rowing racing boats